Sanni Grahn-Laasonen (born 4 May 1983) is a Finnish politician and a member of the National Coalition Party. She has been the Minister of Education and Culture since 29 May 2015. She was the Minister of the Environment in Alexander Stubb's cabinet between 2014 and 2015. Before her career in politics she has worked as a journalist in the Finnish afternoon newspaper Iltalehti.

Electoral history

Parliamentary elections

References

1983 births
Living people
People from Forssa
Finnish Lutherans
National Coalition Party politicians
Minister of the Environment of Finland
Ministers of Education of Finland
Members of the Parliament of Finland (2011–15)
Members of the Parliament of Finland (2015–19)
Members of the Parliament of Finland (2019–23)
Women government ministers of Finland
21st-century Finnish women politicians
Women members of the Parliament of Finland
University of Helsinki alumni